The Oshirakawa Dam is a rock-fill dam on the Oshirakawa River (a tributary of the Shō River) about  southwest of Shirakawa in Gifu Prefecture, Japan. It was constructed between 1961 and 1963.

See also

Hatogaya Dam – downstream on the Shō River

References

Dams in Gifu Prefecture
Rock-filled dams
Dams completed in 1963
Dams on the Shō River
Hydroelectric power stations in Japan